Bernard Kates (December 26, 1922 – February 2, 2010) was an American actor on television, in movies and on the stage.

Serving as a bomber pilot during World War II, Kates earned an Air Medal with three clusters and a Distinguished Flying Cross.

A life member of The Actors Studio, Kates's film appearances include Judgment at Nuremberg (as Max Perkins), The Babe, and The Phantom.

One of his many television roles was as Sigmund Freud in the Star Trek: The Next Generation episode "Phantasms". He also portrayed a Jewish resistance fighter in the 1960 television play In the Presence of Mine Enemies (Playhouse 90).

Kates' Broadway credits include The Devils (1965), Have I Got a Girl for You! (1963), The Disenchanted (1958), Billy Budd (1951), and At War With the Army (1949). He was a resident actor with the Great Lakes Shakespeare Festival in Cleveland, Ohio, for nine summers, and he was also active in "a noteworthy run of shows" at the Pacific Conservatory of the Performing Arts in Santa Maria, California.

On February 2, 2010, complications resulting from sepsis and pneumonia led to Kates' death in a hospital in Lake Havasu City, Arizona, at age 87.

Filmography

References

External links
 
 
 

1922 births
2010 deaths
American male film actors
Deaths from pneumonia in Arizona
Deaths from sepsis
People from Lake Havasu City, Arizona
Male actors from Boston
Military personnel from Massachusetts
American military personnel of World War II
American World War II bomber pilots